Andy Mitchell (born 18 April 1990) is an English footballer who is a winger. He made four appearances in The Football League for Chester City.

Career

A product of Chester's youth policy, 17-year-old Mitchell made his Football League debut as a substitute for Paul Rutherford when Chester visited Darlington on 4 March 2008, under new manager Simon Davies. He went on to appear in three more league matches before the season ended. Mitchell followed fellow youngsters such as Neil Carroll, Paul McManus, Sean Newton and Kevin Roberts in making his senior debut that season for the club.

He failed to make any more league appearances for Chester and was transferred to Bangor City on 2 February 2009 to along with McManus. The pair spent the remainder of the season at the club before joining Airbus UK Broughton. He no longer plays football for the club.

References

External links

1990 births
Living people
English footballers
Footballers from Liverpool
Association football wingers
Chester City F.C. players
Bangor City F.C. players
Airbus UK Broughton F.C. players
English Football League players
Cymru Premier players